The 1972 Italian Republic Grand Prix was a non-championship Formula One race held at Vallelunga Circuit on June 18, 1972.

Results

References 
Footnotes

Sources
 Race at Silhouet.com
 1972 Italian Republic Grand Prix – ChicaneF1

Italian Republic Grand Prix